Juran is a surname. Notable people with the surname include:

 Joseph M. Juran (1904–2008), Romanian-American management consultant, quality pioneer
 Mladen Juran (born 1942), Croatian film director, screenwriter, and actor
 Nathan H. Juran (1907–2002), Romanian-American film director